Serhiy Nahorniy (born December 8, 1956) is a Soviet sprint canoeist who competed from the late 1970s and the early 1980s. Competing in two Summer Olympics, he won two medals at Montreal in 1976 with a gold in the K-2 1000 m and a silver in the K-2 500 m events.

Nahorny also won two bronze medals at the ICF Canoe Sprint World Championships, earning them in the K-2 1000 m (1977) and K-4 1000 m (1979) events.

References

Sports-reference.com profile (As Sergey Nagorny)

1956 births
Canoeists at the 1976 Summer Olympics
Canoeists at the 1980 Summer Olympics
Living people
Soviet male canoeists
Olympic canoeists of the Soviet Union
Olympic gold medalists for the Soviet Union
Olympic silver medalists for the Soviet Union
Olympic medalists in canoeing
Ukrainian male canoeists
ICF Canoe Sprint World Championships medalists in kayak
Dynamo sports society athletes
Sportspeople from Khmelnytskyi, Ukraine
Medalists at the 1976 Summer Olympics